The Future Fire is a small press, online science fiction magazine, run by a joint British-US team of editors. The magazine was launched in January 2005 and releases issues four times a year, with stories, articles, and reviews in both HTML and PDF formats. At times (notably 2006–7, 2010–11) issues appeared more sporadically than this.

Contents 
The Future Fire publishes both fiction and nonfiction. For fiction it publishes Speculative Fiction, Cyberpunk and Dark Fantasy, with a focus on social and political themes and mundane rather than hard SF. In the area of nonfiction it publishes reviews and interviews with people such as Cory Doctorow, author of Down and Out in the Magic Kingdom, and Kevin Warwick the Cyborg scientist, articles on new media, posthumanism, and artificial intelligence. In 2010 The Future Fire published themed issues on Feminist science fiction and Queer science fiction.

The Future Fire has published stories by:
 Neil Ayres
 Bruce Boston
 Rebecca Buchanan
 Silvia Moreno-Garcia
 Maria Grech Ganado
 Terry Grimwood
 Rhys Hughes
 Vylar Kaftan
 Petra Kuppers
 Alison Littlewood
 Sandra McDonald
 Sarah Pinsker
 Steven Pirie
 Malena Salazar Maciá
 Sofia Samatar
 Brett Alexander Savory
 Benjanun Sriduangkaew
 Richard Thieme
 Lavie Tidhar
 Jo Walton
 Aliya Whiteley
 Lynda Williams

And included illustrations and artwork by:
 Martin Hanford
 Tais Teng

The Future Fire has run occasional writers' conventions and competitions, including a flash fiction contest sponsored by the MirrorMask movie, and a satirical writing contest based on spam subject lines judged by Peter Tennant.

Staff
 Djibril al-Ayad, General editor
 Regina de Burca, Associate editor
 Valeria Vitale, Associate editor

Anthologies 
The Future Fire has published five anthologies (under the imprint Futurefire.net Publications): Outlaw Bodies, co-edited by Lori Selke, in 2012, a collection of stories on the theme of forbidden or constrained bodies, disability, feminism and trans issues; and We See a Different Frontier, co-edited with Fabio Fernandes in 2013, with preface by Aliette de Bodard and critical afterword by Ekaterina Sedia, which raised over $4,500 in crowdfunding via Peerbackers; A third anthology, Accessing the Future, co-edited by Kathryn Allan, raised over $8,000 via IndieGogo, and received a starred review from Publishers Weekly; TFF-X (co-edited by Djibril al-Ayad, Cécile Matthey and Valeria Vitale) and Fae Visions of the Mediterranean (co-edited by Valeria Vitale) appeared in late 2015 and early 2016 respectively. A mixed anthology of fiction and essays related to classical monsters, Making Monsters co-edited by Emma Bridges, was jointly released with the Institute of Classical Studies in 2018.

References

External links
 Original site
 Entry in Encyclopaedia of Science Fiction
 Review of Future Fire 8 in Whispers of Wickedness (site down: Wayback Machine version)
 Interview with TFF editor in MBR:Points (site down)
 Review of Future Fire 20
 Spotlight on The Future Fire by The Outer Alliance (site down: Wayback Machine version)
 Interview with TFF editor in Duotrope's Digest.
 Interview with editor (from 2011) in The Apprentice Storyteller (site down: Wayback Machine)

Science fiction magazines published in the United States
Science fiction magazines published in the United Kingdom
Magazines established in 2005
Feminist science fiction
2005 establishments in the United Kingdom
2005 establishments in the United States
Online magazines published in the United Kingdom